Makedonska Kamenica (till 1950 Kamenica) is a town in the north-east of North Macedonia. It has 5,147 inhabitants, the majority of whom are ethnic Macedonians. The town is the seat of Makedonska Kamenica Municipality.

Demographics
According to the 2002 census, the village had a total of 5,147 inhabitants. Ethnic groups in the village include:

Macedonians 5,096
Serbs 20
Romani 14
Bosniaks 8
Others 9

Sports
Local football club FK Sasa spent several seasons in the Macedonian top tier and won the Macedonian Republic League in 1992.

References

Towns in North Macedonia
Makedonska Kamenica Municipality